Raya Malla was a Malla Dynasty king and the first King of Bhadgaon after the division of Kathmandu Valley into Kantipur, Patan, and Bhadgaon. He reigned from 1482 until his death in 1505. He was the son of Jayayakshya Malla. His younger brother, Ratna Malla, ruled over Kantipur.

Reign 
During his reign, the Bhadgaon bordered Dudh Koshi. Raya Malla established the Catur Varna Mahavihara in Bhaktapur. He died in 1505 and was succeeded by his son Bhuwana Malla.

References

Malla rulers of Bhaktapur
15th-century Nepalese people
16th-century Nepalese people
1505 deaths